The motorways in North Macedonia are called avtopat and the name, like its translation in most languages, simply means auto road.

The system has inherited some from the former Yugoslavia, although new sections have been completely built in the recent years.
The total length of the motorway network as of December 2020 is 317 km, with extra 57 km being under construction. The works on the first couple kilometers of the motorway from Skopje to Kosovo's border started in 2020, while the Gostivar-Kicevo section is expected to start in 2022. Also there are plans to extend the A2 motorway from Trebenista to Kjafasan making a motorway connection to the border with Albania. Furthermore, most stretches of the existing network have been reconstructed, so overall the Macedonian motorways are in decent shape

The highways were originally marked with yellow-colour hard shoulder lines and some of these remain in place, they are however slowly being phased out and replaced with white. The motorway roadsigns maintain their green colour background, a feature shared with Switzerland, Italy, Denmark, Sweden, Greece, Czech Republic, Lithuania and the United States as well as the other former Yugoslav republics. The roads are on the whole straight with good surfacing, and better maintained than the national roads.

Motorway A1

The first motorway runs from the Tabanovce border crossing with Serbia (for Preševo), passing Kumanovo (A2 junction), Petrovec (Skopje Airport) near Skopje (A3 junction), Veles, Gradsko (A5 junction) Negotino (A7 junction), and continuing onto the main border crossing with Greece, Bogorodica-Evzoni near Gevgelija.

The large part of this express route was built whilst North Macedonia was a part of the SFR Yugoslavia, with the Kumanovo-Petrovec section first opened for traffic in 1979. The motorway was completed in 2004 in time for the 2004 Athens Olympics.

For approximately 30 km between Skopje Airport and Veles, the motorway splits, creating a gradual distance of several kilometres. The northbound route is the postulated motorway route whilst the slightly longer southbound route, with dangerous bends, is the old road and is being used as a freeway as it is only one-way. There are no plans at present to develop the northbound route into two separate carriageways thus perfecting the network.

The motorway A1 is part of European route E75.

Motorway A2

The A2 is a route that connects Kriva Palanka and the Deve Bair border crossing with Bulgaria with Ohrid. The route passes Skopje through the ring-road and enters the already constructed motorway that connects Tetovo with Gostivar. The part of the route that bypasses Kičevo and ends in Ohrid is planned to be turned into a motorway with 4 lanes by December 2023. Currently only the section from Miladinovci (interchange with A1) to Gostivar is a divided motorway, where the Tetovo-Gostivar section (25 km)  is missing hard shoulders. The stretch of A2 from Skopje's Ring Road to Ohrid is part of the European corridor E65.

Motorway A3

Currently, only a small section of the route A3 is a motorway (the one that goes along A4 from Štip to Kadrifakovo), while some sections are in the process of turning into express roads. The route traverses the country from east to west, between the border with Bulgaria near Delčevo, via Kočani, Štip (A4 junction), Veles (A1 junction), Prilep, Bitola, ending in Ohrid (A2 junction). Four lane express roads are being built in the stretches between Štip and Kočani as well as between Prilep and Gradsko. There are plans to build express roads with a possibility to upgrade them to motorways at the sections Bitola - Greece's border and Prilep - Bitola.

Motorway A4

The A4 connects Kosovo with Skopje and continues southeast towards Štip, Radoviš, and Strumica, eventually reaching the border with Bulgaria near Novo Selo. The 47 km stretch from Miladinovci to Štip was completed in late 2018, while the works on the Skopje - Blace (Kosovo border) section began in 2020. Further south-east from Štip to Radovis, there is an express road, which could potentially be upgraded to a motorway in the future.

See also
Transport in North Macedonia
List of controlled-access highway systems
Evolution of motorway construction in European nations

References

 
Road transport in North Macedonia
Roads in North Macedonia